Oliver Konsa (born 4 March 1985)  is an Estonian professional footballer, who last played in Estonian Meistriliiga club JK Nõmme Kalju. His contract with his team was suspended, after being arrested in suspicion of drug-related crimes. On 27 September 2013 he pleaded guilty. He was released on 9 January 2014 based on settlement. He played the position of striker and is 1.83 m tall and weighs 74 kg.

Club career

Statistics
As of 11 November 2012.

International career
He made his national team debut, alongside Gert Kams and Siim Roops, on 3 February 2007 against Poland, when he came on as a substitute in the second half.

References

External links
 
 Soccernet.ee profile
 
 

1985 births
Sportspeople from Tartu
Living people
Tartu JK Tammeka players
FC TVMK players
FC Flora players
Nõmme Kalju FC players
Estonian footballers
Estonia international footballers
Association football midfielders
Association football forwards